The fifth season of the reality television series Love & Hip Hop: Atlanta aired on VH1 from April 4, 2016, until August 8, 2016. The show was primarily filmed in Atlanta, Georgia. It was executively produced by Mona Scott-Young and Stephanie R. Gayle for Monami Entertainment, Toby Barraud, Stefan Springman, Mala Chapple, David DiGangi, Lashan Browning and Donna Edge-Rachell for Eastern TV, and Nina L. Diaz and Vivian Gomez for VH1.

The series chronicles the lives of several women and men in the Atlanta area, involved in hip hop music. It consists of 18 episodes, including Exposed and Unfiltered, a two-part reunion special hosted by Nina Parker.

Production

On March 8, 2016, VH1 announced that Love & Hip Hop: Atlanta would be returning for a fifth season on April 4, 2016. A 5-minute long "super-trailer" was released on March 28, 2016. This season featured an entirely new opening credits sequence. With the exception of Erica Dixon, who quit the show, all main cast members from the previous season returned. Tammy Rivera returned to the main cast after a season's absence, along with original cast member K. Michelle, who returned from the fourth episode "Blackmail". Although credited in every episode after that, Michelle appeared infrequently with no major storylines and barely interacted with the rest of the cast. Lyfe Jennings and Rasheeda's mother Shirleen Harvell joined the supporting cast, along with "momager" Karen "KK" King, her son Scrapp DeLeon, Scrapp's girlfriend Tommie Lee, his baby mama Tiarra Becca, Mimi's partner Chris Gould, Grammy Award-winning songwriter D. Smith and her best friend Betty Idol. Kirk's daughter Kelsie Frost, Scrapp's brother Sas, radio personality J-Nicks and stripper Amber Priddy appeared in minor supporting roles. 

D. Smith became the first openly transgender castmate in the show's history. Gould would reveal his identity as a trans man in an episode near the end of season. Several episodes featured public service announcements aimed to help viewers struggling with their gender identity. The fourteenth episode, "Confessions", set in Los Angeles, featured crossovers with Love & Hip Hop: Hollywood and K. Michelle: My Life, with guest appearances from cast members Lil Fizz, Nikki Mudarris and Jonathan Fernandez. 

For the first time in the show's history, this season did not include a traditional reunion special filmed onstage in New York in front of a studio audience as with the previous seasons. Instead the cast filmed separately or in smaller groups at a mansion in Atlanta, GA, due to concerns for the cast and crew's safety after Joseline and Tommie's violent rivalry got police involved.

Synopsis
The season opens with the introduction of the King family, who are trying to hold everything together as one of their own, Scrapp DeLeon, faces long term jail time. Mimi shocks the girls with her new lover, Chris. Karlie is unsure about her relationship with Lyfe and suspects he may be keeping secrets from her. Scrappy and Joc are enjoying the bachelor life. Tammy is dealing with the fall-out from Waka's comments on the trans community when she encounters D. Smith and Betty Idol. Stevie J and Joseline return from their adventures in Hollywood on shaky ground.

Reception
The season, including the reunion's format, received mixed reviews from fans and critics, with writer Michael Arceneaux criticizing it for being "not up to par" due its focus on its new cast members "whose problems I didn’t care about".

Cast

Starring

 Mimi Faust (17 episodes)
 Rasheeda (15 episodes)
 Karlie Redd (15 episodes)
 Tammy Rivera (12 episodes)
 K. Michelle (7 episodes)
 Joseline Hernandez (14 episodes)
 Stevie J (16 episodes)
Note:

Added to opening credits from episode 4 onwards.

Also starring

 Yung Joc (13 episodes)
 Karen King (12 episodes)
 Scrapp DeLeon (12 episodes)
 Lil Scrappy (14 episodes)
 Momma Dee (12 episodes)
 Tommie Lee (16 episodes)
 Jessica Dime (14 episodes)
 Tiarra Becca (13 episodes)
 Chris Gould (8 episodes)
 Ariane Davis (10 episodes)
 Kirk Frost (12 episodes)
 D. Smith (8 episodes)
 Betty Idol (10 episodes)
 Bambi Benson (11 episodes)
 Waka Flocka Flame (2 episodes)
 Deb Antney (4 episodes)
 Lyfe Jennings (5 episodes)
 Kelsie Frost (6 episodes)
 Dawn Heflin (8 episodes)
 Shirleen Harvell (8 episodes)
 Ernest Bryant (7 episodes)
 Sas (11 episodes)
 J-Nicks (8 episodes)
 Amber Priddy (3 episodes)

Scrappy's assistant Taylor Hall and Tammy's friend Shod Santiago would appear as guest stars in several episodes. The show features minor appearances from notable figures within the hip hop industry and Atlanta's social scene, including T-Pain, Bu Thiam, Bobby V, Chaz Gotti, Katt Williams, CeeLo Green, Faith Evans, Tony Rock, Russell Simmons, Love & Hip Hop: Hollywoods Lil' Fizz and Nikki Mudarris, K. Michelle: My Lifes Jonathan Fernandez, Fly Dantoni, Deelishis and Young Dro.

Episodes

Music
Several cast members had their music featured on the show and released singles to coincide with the airing of the episodes.

References

External links

2016 American television seasons
Love & Hip Hop